Nieuwe-Wetering is a hamlet in the Dutch province of Utrecht. It is a part of the municipality of De Bilt, and lies about 3 km northwest of Bilthoven.

It was first mentioned in 1846 as Nieuwe-Wetering (de), and means the new polder canal. Nieuwe-Wetering is not a statistical entity, and the postal authorities have placed it under Groenekan. Nieuwe-Wetering has put up its own place name signs. In 1840, it was home to 65 people. Nowadays, it consists of about 20 houses.

References
 

Populated places in Utrecht (province)
De Bilt